Boletellus dicymbophilus is a species of fungus in the family Boletaceae. Found in Guyana, it was described as new to science in 2008.

References

Fungi of Guyana
dicymbophilus
Fungi described in 2008